The 1996 Formula Nippon Championship was the first season under the name Formula Nippon; before 1996, the category was named Japanese Formula 3000. This season was contested over 10 rounds. Fifteen different teams, 28 different drivers, three different chassis and three different engines competed. Ralf Schumacher won the championship, winning three races.

This was the final season for six-time Top Formula Champion Kazuyoshi Hoshino, who announced his retirement from the series prior to the start of the 1997 season.

Teams and drivers

Race calendar and results

Standings
For every race points were awarded: 10 points to the winner, 6 for runner-up, 4 for third place, 3 for fourth place, 2 for fifth place and 1 for sixth place. No additional points were awarded. No driver had a point deduction.

Driver's championship

Team's championship

Complete Overview

R=retired NC=not classified NS=did not start NQ=did not qualify

External links
1996 Japanese Championship Formula Nippon

Formula Nippon
Super Formula
Nippon